On Breath (Greek: Περὶ πνεύματος; Latin: De spiritu) is a philosophical treatise included in the Corpus Aristotelicum but usually regarded as spurious.  Its opening sentence raises the question: "What is the mode of growth, and the mode of maintenance, of the natural (or 'connate': emphutos) vital spirit (pneuma)?"

Authorship
Among the ancient catalogues of Aristotle's works, a work On Breath (but in three books, not one) is listed only by Ptolemy-el-Garib, and Pliny the Elder (N.H. XI.220) and Galen (De simpl. med. temp. et fac. V.9) are the first authors who appear to make reference to the treatise we possess.  In modern times, its authenticity has been virtually unanimously rejected, although most or all of it has been acknowledged to be an early work of the Peripatetic school, possibly connected with Theophrastus, Strato of Lampsacus, or Erasistratus, and shedding light on Hellenistic medicine.  

In 2008, however, Bos and Ferwerda published a commentary in which they maintain that On Breath is a genuine work of Aristotle whose doctrines respond to those of Plato's Timaeus and constitute an important part of Aristotle's philosophy of nature.  They list a number of positions that On Breath defends such as that fish don't breathe because there is no air in water that Aristotle is known to have held.  They also consider the position on the soul to be that of Aristotle.

See also
 On Youth, Old Age, Life and Death, and Respiration

Notes

References
Commentaries
 Daniel Furlanus, Theophrasti Eresii, Peripateticorum post Aristotelem principis pleraque... (Greek text with Latin translation and commentary), Hanover, 1605 (available online).
 Amneris Roselli, [Aristotele]: De spiritu (Greek text with Italian translation and commentary), Pisa: ETS Editrice, 1992.
 Abraham P. Bos and Rein Ferwerda, Aristotle, On the Life-Bearing Spirit (De Spiritu): A Discussion with Plato and his Predecessors on Pneuma as the Instrumental Body of the Soul (with English translation and commentary), Leiden: Brill, 2008.

External links
 English translation: J. F. Dobson's 1914 Oxford translation bound with De Mundo, pp. "32" ff. (archive.org)
 Greek text: Werner Jaeger's 1913 Teubner text available in HTML format via Greco interattivo
De Spiritu, translated by J. F. Dobson (Sharper Scan of 1931 Edition) 
 

Works by Aristotle